Libellula comanche, the Comanche skimmer, is a species of skimmer in the family Libellulidae. It is found in Central America and North America.

The IUCN conservation status of Libellula comanche is "LC", least concern, with no immediate threat to the species' survival. The population is stable.

References

 Garrison, Rosser W. / Poole, Robert W., and Patricia Gentili, eds. (1997). "Odonata". Nomina Insecta Nearctica: A Check List of the Insects of North America, vol. 4: Non-Holometabolous Orders, 551-580.
 Paulson, Dennis R., and Sidney W. Dunkle (1999). "A Checklist of North American Odonata including English name, etymology, type locality, and distribution". Slater Museum of Natural History, University of Puget Sound, Occasional Paper no. 56, 88.

Further reading

 Arnett, Ross H. (2000). American Insects: A Handbook of the Insects of America North of Mexico. CRC Press.

Libellulidae
Insects described in 1907